"Come On In" is a song written by Michael Clark, and recorded by American country music group The Oak Ridge Boys.  It was released in December 1978 as the second and final single from their album Room Service.  The song spent fifteen weeks on the Hot Country Songs charts between December 1978 and early 1979, peaking at number three.  The song was also their last release for ABC Records before the label merged with MCA Records.

The song was also covered by Dave & Sugar, who included it on their 1978 Tear Time album (though they changed the title to "Baby, Take Your Coat Off").

It is not to be confused with the band's 1985 single "Come On In (You Did the Best You Could Do)".

Chart performance

References

1978 singles
1978 songs
Dave & Sugar songs
The Oak Ridge Boys songs
Songs written by Michael Clark (songwriter)
Song recordings produced by Ron Chancey
ABC Records singles